William of Apulia was a chronicler of the Normans, writing in the 1090s. His Latin epic, Gesta Roberti Wiscardi ("The Deeds of Robert Guiscard"), written in hexameters, is one of the principal contemporary sources for the Norman conquest of southern Italy, especially the career of Robert Guiscard, Duke of Apulia (1059–1085).

Background 
Little is known about William's life before he wrote his history of the Normans.  Unlike the other two principal chroniclers of the Normans in Italy (Amatus of Montecassino and Geoffrey Malaterra), William was probably a layman, based on the relative lack of religious references in his work.  It is also quite possible that William was a Lombard, rather than a Norman, as his treatment of Lombard characters in his history is very sympathetic when compared to his contemporary Norman counterparts.

The Gesta Roberti Wiscardi 
William's poem Gesta Roberti Wiscardi was probably composed sometime between 1097 and 1099, as he notes the fighting of the crusaders in Anatolia during 1097, but not the fall of Jerusalem in 1099.   The poem was dedicated to Duke Roger Borsa son of duke Robert Guiscard, implying that he was a member of the former's court.  More than the works of his two fellow chroniclers of the Normans, Amatus of Montecassino and Geoffrey Malaterra, William's work is a tribute to Robert Guiscard, which may indicate that Roger commissioned it to strengthen his claim to his father's titles.

Editions
William of Apulia, trans. Graham A. Loud, “The Deeds of Robert Guiscard”, (PDF)

References

Italian male poets
Italo-Normans
People from Apulia
11th-century Italian historians
12th-century Latin writers
Italian male non-fiction writers
11th-century Latin writers
11th-century Italian poets